Jessica Parker Kennedy (born October 3, 1984) is a Canadian actress. She played Melissa Glaser on the CW series The Secret Circle, Max on the Starz original series Black Sails and Nora West-Allen / XS on The Flash, and has also appeared on the television series Smallville, Undercovers, Kaya and Colony.

Early life
Kennedy was born in Calgary, Alberta, Canada, the child of a black father and a white mother. Growing up, Kennedy says there were very few people of colour around, and she was friends with the sole black girl at her school. She had gravitated to friendships with other black people later as a means of finding community. Kennedy was raised Jewish.

Career
Kennedy portrayed supervillain Plastique in the television series Smallville, the role of Tami in the 2008 comedy film Another Cinderella Story and the recurring character of Natalee on the 2007 television series Kaya on MTV.

Kennedy was originally cast in the J. J. Abrams-produced 2010 spy drama series Undercovers as the younger sister of the female lead (played by Gugu Mbatha-Raw) but was later replaced by Mekia Cox. Kennedy played Melissa Glaser in the CW series The Secret Circle, until the show was cancelled after one season in May 2012. Kennedy was cast as the ambitious Nassau prostitute named Max on the Starz TV show Black Sails. In 2017, Kennedy joined the CW's Arrowverse, appearing primarily on the live-action series The Flash. Her character appeared throughout the fourth season and was eventually revealed as Nora West-Allen, and was promoted to series regular for the fifth season using the superhero name XS. She has since returned in recurring capacities for seasons seven and eight.
Kennedy is set to appear in a guest role as Medusa in the Disney+ series Percy Jackson and the Olympians.

Personal life 
She is married to  Israeli-American actor Ronen Rubinstein, they reside in Los Angeles, and she was very supportive of him coming out as being bisexual. They married in August 2022, with a Jewish wedding ceremony.

Filmography

Film

Television

References

External links
 

1984 births
21st-century Canadian actresses
Actresses from Calgary
Black Canadian actresses
Canadian film actresses
Canadian Jews
Canadian television actresses
Canadian people of Irish descent
Jewish Canadian actresses
Living people